Spas-Demensky District is an administrative and municipal district (raion), one of the twenty-four in Kaluga Oblast, Russia. It is located in the west of the oblast. Its administrative center is the town of Spas-Demensk. As of the 2021 Census, the total population of the district was 7,369, with the population of Spas-Demensk accounting for 62.0% of that number.

History
The district was established in 1929 within Sukhinichi Okrug of Western Oblast from a part of former Mosalsky Uyezd. It became a part of Kaluga Oblast on July 5, 1944.

References

Notes

Sources

Districts of Kaluga Oblast
States and territories established in 1929
